Samantha Bowers (born January 4, 1994), known professionally as Sammy Rae, is an American singer and songwriter who fronts the band Sammy Rae & The Friends. Her EP The Good Life released in 2018.

Career
Born Samantha Bowers in Derby, Connecticut, Sammy Rae moved to New York City at age 19 to pursue songwriting and study music at Manhattan College. Here, she waited tables and regularly sang at open mic shows. Rae and six other musicians (known as "The Friends", consisting of Kellon Reese (alto saxophone), Max Zooi (tenor saxophone), James Quinlan (bass), Debbie Tjong (keys and background music), Will Leet (guitarist) and C-bass Chiriboga (drums)) formed "Sammy Rae and The Friends" in Brooklyn during 2016. Rae stated she has been influenced by church music (particularly gospel) and classic rock, as well as Bob Dylan and Paul Simon for vocals and the E Street Band for their group dynamics. In 2018, her band, Sammy Rae and the Friends, released The Good Life EP, followed in 2021 by the EP Let's Throw a Party. Through 2021 and 2022, the band gained popularity on Spotify, partly due to being featured on the platform's "Discover Weekly" playlist.  Originally, they were set to tour in 2020, but the effects of the COVID-19 pandemic forced them to cancel. In 2021, the band embarked on the Follow Me Like The Moon Tour, playing shows across the United States, as well as Toronto, Ontario. They then went on the If It All Goes South tour from October to November 2022.

Discography 
Extended plays

 Hopeless
 Celebrate my Heart
 Sugar
 The Good Life
Let's Throw a Party

Singles
 Closer to You (2023)
 If it all Goes South  (2022)
 For the Time Being  (2022)
 Follow Me Like the Moon (2022)
 Everybody Wants to Rule the World (2021)
 Last Christmas (2020)
 Living Room Floor (2020)
 Jackie Onassis (2020)
 Whatever We Feel (2020)
 Denim Jacket (2019)
 The Box (2019)
 Saw It Coming (2019)
 Kick It to Me (2018)

Notes

References 

People from Derby, Connecticut
Living people
1994 births